Micralestes vittatus is a species of fish in the family Alestidae. It is endemic to Tanzania.  Its natural habitat is rivers.

References

Micralestes
Fish of Lake Tanganyika
Freshwater fish of Tanzania
Endemic fauna of Tanzania
Taxa named by George Albert Boulenger
Fish described in 1917
Taxonomy articles created by Polbot